Thomas ab Owen (by 1511 – 1575 or later), of Haverfordwest, Pembrokeshire, was a Welsh politician.

Family
Thomas married, by 1532, a woman named Isabella.

Career
Thomas was a Member of Parliament for Haverfordwest in 1558.

References

English MPs 1558
Members of the Parliament of England (pre-1707) for constituencies in Wales
People from Haverfordwest
Year of birth uncertain
16th-century deaths
16th-century Welsh politicians